Thomas Snow may refer to:

 Thomas Snow (British Army officer) (1858–1940)
 Thomas Snow (pianist), American jazz musician and academic
Thomas Maitland Snow, British diplomat
 Tom Snow (born 1947), American songwriter
 Icicle (comics) or Thomas Snow, a fictional character in the television series The Flash